Park Eun-ji is a Korean name consisting of the family name Park and the given name Eun-ji, and may also refer to:

 Park Eun-ji (politician) (1979-2014), South Korean politician
 Park Eun-ji (television personality) (born 1983), South Korean television personality

See also
 Park Jin Young (born 1971), South Korean singer-songwriter